N30 may refer to:

Roads 
 N30 road (Belgium), a National Road in Belgium
 Route nationale 30, in France
 N30 road (Ireland)
 N-30 National Highway, in Pakistan

Other uses 
 1999 Seattle WTO protests, a series of protests surrounding the WTO Ministerial Conference of 1999
 Acer N30, a PDA
 Catalog of 5,268 Standard Stars Based on the Normal System N30, a star catalogue
 Cherry Ridge Airport, serving Honesdale, Pennsylvania, United States
 Cystitis
 Net 30, a form of trade credit
 Newport 30, an American sailboat
 Toyota Hilux (N30), a Japanese pickup truck
 "N30", a song by Avail, from their 2000 album One Wrench